Mar Shimun XX Paulos (1885 in Qodshanis, Hakkari, Ottoman Empire – 27 April 1920 in Baquba, Ottoman Empire) served as the 118th Catholicos-Patriarch of the Assyrian Church of the East.

After his brother, Catholicos-Patriarch Mar Shimun XIX Benyamin, was murdered along with 150 of his followers by Simko Shikak (Ismail Agha Shikak), a Kurdish agha, Mar Shimun XX Paulos was elected on 23 March 1918. He was consecrated in the ancient Church of Mart Maryam (Saint Mary) in Urmia by the metropolitan Mar Eskhaq Khnanisho and the bishops Mar Eliya Abuna of Alqosh, Mar Yosip Khnanisho of Shemsdin (the metropolitan's designated successor), and Mar Zaya Sargis of Jilu.

On 20 August 1918, for fear of persecution from the Ottoman Turks during their campaign of genocide against Armenians, Assyrians, and other Christians of the Ottoman Empire, the newly elected Catholicos-Patriarch fled with about 60,000 of his people from Urmia in Iran seeking the protection of the British in Iraq. 15,000 of his followers died on the way. The survivors were in a camp in Baquba, about 50 kilometers north of Baghdad. Becoming very sick, Shimun XX spent his short patriarchal days at Mor Mottai monastery belonging to the Syriac Orthodox Church of Antioch. He died on 27 April 1920 and buried on 9 May 1920 in the Armenian cemetery in Baghdad.

The episcopacy of the Autocephalous Assyrian Church of the East at this time consisted only of four bishops: Mar Yosip Khnanisho, Mar Zaya Sargis of Jilu, Mar Yalda Yahballaha of Barwari and Mar Abimalek Timothy (South India).

Mar Shimun XX Paulos' successor was Shimun XXI Eshai.

See also
List of Patriarchs of the Assyrian Church of the East

References

Sources
 
 
 
 
 Rudolf Macuch:History of the late and neusyrischen literature. De Gruyter, Berlin 1976, 253ff. 
 Austin: The Baqubah Refugee Camp. An Account of Work on behalf of the Persecuted Assyrian Christians, The Faith Press, London 1920
 David Wilmshurst:The Ecclesiastical Organization of the Church of the East, 1318-1913. (Corpus Scriptorum Christianorum Orientalium 582 / Subs. 104). Peeters, Leuven 2000, 367th .

External links 
 Official site of the Assyrian Church of the East

1885 births
1920 deaths
People from Hakkari
Paulos
Assyrians from the Ottoman Empire
20th-century bishops of the Assyrian Church of the East